Chamba is a village in the Khyber Pakhtunkhwa province of Pakistan. It is located at 34°2'0N 73°6'0E with an altitude of 725 metres (2381 feet).

References

Populated places in Abbottabad District